The Miss Universe Kosovo 2012 pageant was held on June 21, 2012. This year only 20 candidates were competing for the national crown. Each delegate represented a municipality of the country. Eventual winner, Diana Avdiu, represented Kosovo at  Miss Universe 2012 placing in the Top 16 semifinalist. The Miss Earth Kosovo represented the country in Miss Earth 2012 without placing. The Miss Supranational Kosovo represented the country in Miss Supranational 2012 without placing.

Final Results

Special Awards
Best National Costume - Fijona Rama (Kaçaniku)
Miss Congeniality (voted by the candidates) - Elga Shala (Deçan)
Miss Elegance - Nebahate Fazliu (Gjilan)
Miss Internet - Diana Avdiu (Fushë Kosovë)
Miss Model - Donika Pasjaqa (Shtërpcë)
Miss Photogenic - Leonora Xhemajlaj (Podujevë)
Miss Press - Diana Avdiu (Fushë Kosovë)

Official Delegates

See also
 Miss Universe Kosovo

External links
 Official Website

Miss Kosovo
2012 beauty pageants
2012 in Kosovo